Fly was a brig of 100 tons that sailed from Calcutta, India, on 14 May 1802 bound for Sydney, New South Wales. She was never heard of again. At the time of her disappearance she was owned by the House of Campbells, Calcutta.

References

Maritime history of Australia
Shipwrecks in the Indian Ocean
History of New South Wales
Maritime incidents in 1802
Missing ships
Ships lost with all hands